The Gates Mixed Plate is the tenth studio album by rapper Tech N9ne, which was released on July 27, 2010. It is the third album in the rapper's "Collabos" series, following the 2009 album Sickology 101. The album's name is in reference to the Kansas City Bar-B-Q restaurant Gates Bar-B-Q. The album's first single, "O.G." further references the restaurant.

The album has what the artists describes as "lighter music" after the 2009 album, K.O.D., took a "darker" approach. When speaking on the content of the album, the artist said the album "is full of party tracks because I'm trying to rejoice." The album also features guest appearances by Kutt Calhoun, Krizz Kaliko, Big Scoob, Brotha Lynch Hung, Stevie Stone, Jay Rock, Glasses Malone, Yukmouth, Devin the Dude, Irv Da Phenom, and many more.

Singles and videos
On June 11, MTVU.com premiered the music video for the first single, "O.G." The video was directed by Dan Gedman. The single was featured in a list of the "Top 10 Party Anthems for Summer 2010" on ARTISTdirect.com along with the likes of "Can't Be Tamed" (Miley Cyrus), "Ms. Chocolate" (Lil' Jon) and "Alejandro" (Lady Gaga).

Both "O.G." and "Jumpin' Jax" were released as digital singles on June 29, 2010. The official video for "KC Tea" was released on the Strange Music YouTube channel on July 21, 2010. The video was directed by Dan Gedman.

Commercial performance
The album sold 17,000 copies in its first week and 5,000 copies during its second. Record sales reached upwards of 22,000 copies in only 2 weeks. To date, album has sold about 50,000 copies.

Track listing

Personnel
Aaron Bean – Street marketing
Alan Wayne – Featured performer
Alistair Photography – Photography
Andrea Lopez – Additional vocals
Anita Hilanthom – Additional vocals
Ben Grossi – Project consultant/general management
Big Scoob – Featured performer
Bishop YoungDon – Featured performer
Bizzy – Featured performer
Bob Grossi – Project consultant/general management
Brett Morrow – Internet marketing
Brian B Shynin – Skit
Brian Fraser – Production assistant
Brian Shafton – Project consultant/general management
Britton Kimler – Marketing & promotions
Brooklyn Martino – Skit
Brother K.T. – Skit
Caitlin Sutter – Additional vocals
Chillest Illest – Featured performer
Chris Rooney – Marketing & promotions
Cory Nielson – Production assistant
Crystal Watson – Additional vocals
Dave Weiner – Associate producer
Dawn O'Guin – Production assistant
Demecica Frazier – Additional vocals
Devin the Dude – Featured performer
Emaydee – Producer
Glasses Malone – Featured performer
Glenda Cowan – Production assistant
Irv da Phenom – Featured performer
Jennifer Rogers – Additional vocals
JL (of B. Hood) – Featured performer
Joe Vertigo – Featured performer, crap tube
Josh Rickards – Street marketing
JT Quick – Skit
Karbon – Producer
Korey Lloyd – Production assistant, project management/publicity coordinator
Krizz Kaliko – Featured performer, crap tube
Kutt Calhoun – Featured performer
Liquid 9 – Art direction & design
Makzilla – Featured performer
Matic Lee – Producer
Megan McLean – Publicity
Mike Dupree – Music Producer
Mon. E. G. the Ghostwriter – Featured performer
Nardo – Producer
Ome – Featured performer
P.R.E.A.C.H. – Featured performer
The Popper – Featured performer
Richie Abbott – Publicity
Rivv Loc – Featured performer
Robert Lieberman – Legal
Robert Rebeck – Producer, mixing
Robin Geiger – Additional vocals
Ron Spaulding – Associate producer
Sean Tyler – Skit
Seven – Producer
Stacy Bell – Additional vocals
Stevie Stone – Featured performer
Sundae – Featured performer
Tammy Thornton – Additional vocals
Tay Diggs – Featured performer
Tech N9ne – Primary performer, producer, A&R
Tom Baker – Mastering
Tony G – Skit
Travis O'Guin – Executive producer, A&R
Young Fyre – Producer
Yukmouth – Featured performer

Charts

Weekly charts

References

2010 albums
Tech N9ne albums
Albums produced by Seven (record producer)
Strange Music albums
G-funk albums